Jan Zarycki (8 February 1933 – 27 September 1966) was a Polish alpine skier. He competed in three events at the 1956 Winter Olympics.

References

1933 births
1966 deaths
Polish male alpine skiers
Olympic alpine skiers of Poland
Alpine skiers at the 1956 Winter Olympics
Sportspeople from Zakopane
20th-century Polish people